Anastasiya Vladimirovna Ott (born September 7, 1988) is a Russian track and field athlete who specializes in the 400 metres hurdles. Her personal best is 55.07 achieved at Kazan on July 18, 2008.

She is competing in the 400 metres hurdles at the 2008 Beijing Olympics where she qualified for the second round with the sixth fastest overall time of 55.34 seconds.

External links

1988 births
Living people
Russian female hurdlers
Athletes (track and field) at the 2008 Summer Olympics
Olympic athletes of Russia